Criocerinus is a genus of beetles in the family Cerambycidae, and the only species in the genus is Criocerinus corallinus. It was described by Fairmaire in 1894.

References

Dorcasominae
Beetles described in 1894
Monotypic Cerambycidae genera